1512 Oulu, provisional designation , is a dark Hildian asteroid, slow rotator and possibly the largest known tumbler orbiting in the outermost region of the asteroid belt. With a diameter of approximately 80 kilometers, it belongs to the fifty largest asteroids in the outer main-belt. The body was discovered on 18 March 1939, by Finnish astronomer Heikki Alikoski at Turku Observatory in Southwest Finland and named for the Finnish town Oulu.

Orbit and classification 

Located in the outermost part of the main-belt, Oulu is a member of the Hilda family, a large orbital group of asteroids that are thought to have originated from the Kuiper belt. They orbit in a 3:2 orbital resonance with the gas giant Jupiter, meaning that for every 2 orbits Jupiter completes around the Sun, a Hildian asteroid will complete 3 orbits. As it does not cross the path of any of the planets, it will not be pulled out of orbit by Jupiter's gravitational field, and will likely remain in a stable orbit for thousands of years.

It orbits the Sun at a distance of 3.4–4.6 AU once every 7 years and 11 months (2,891 days). Its orbit has an eccentricity of 0.15 and an inclination of 6° with respect to the ecliptic. Its observation arc, however, begins one month after its official discovery observation.

Physical characteristics 

Oulu is characterized as a dark and reddish P-type asteroid in the Tholen taxonomy, of which only a few dozens bodies are currently known.

Slow rotator and likely tumbler 

In May 2009, a rotational lightcurve of Oulu was obtained from photometric observations by Slovak astronomer Adrián Galád at Modra Observatory. Lightcurve analysis gave a rotation period of 132.3 hours with a brightness variation of 0.33 in magnitude. It is among the top few hundred slow rotators.

Oulu is likely in a state of non-principal axis rotation, which is commonly known as tumbling. It is the largest such object ever observed (also see List of tumblers).

Diameter and albedo 

According to the surveys carried out by the Infrared Astronomical Satellite IRAS, the Japanese Akari satellite, and NASA's Wide-field Infrared Survey Explorer with its subsequent NEOWISE mission, Oulu measures between 65.00 and 91.05 kilometers in diameter, and its surface has an albedo between 0.031 and 0.06.

The Collaborative Asteroid Lightcurve Link agrees with IRAS, that is, an albedo of 0.0366 and a diameter of 82.72 kilometers using an absolute magnitude of 9.62. In May 2002, Vasilij Shevchenko and Edward Tedesco observed an occultation by Oulu, that gave a diameter of 65.0 kilometers with an occultation albedo of 0.0594.

Naming 

This minor planet was named for the northern Finnish town Oulu, the birthplace of the discoverer. The official  was published by the Minor Planet Center on 30 January 1964.

References

External links 
 Asteroid Lightcurve Database (LCDB), query form (info )
 Dictionary of Minor Planet Names, Google books
 Asteroids and comets rotation curves, CdR – Observatoire de Genève, Raoul Behrend
 Discovery Circumstances: Numbered Minor Planets (1)-(5000) – Minor Planet Center
 
 

001512
Discoveries by Heikki A. Alikoski
Named minor planets
001512
001512
19390318